Quadrispora is a genus of fungi in the family Cortinariaceae.

Taxonomy 
The genus contained three species found in Australia however in 2014 two of these were reclassified as Cortinarius species with Quadrispora oblongispora remaining as the only currently accepted species.

References

External links

Cortinariaceae
Agaricales genera